Daviesa is a genus of Australian tangled nest spiders first described by A. Ö. Koçak & M. Kemal in 2008. This genus is named in honour of New Zealand arachnologist Valerie Todd Davies.  it contains only two species.

References

External links

Amaurobiidae
Araneomorphae genera
Spiders of Australia